Daniele Libanori S.J. (born 27 May 1953) is an Italian prelate of the Catholic Church who has been a Auxiliary Bishop of Rome since 2018. He began his career with several years as a parish priest and a decade as rector of the seminary of the Archdiocese of Ferrara. He joined the Jesuits in 1991 and worked as a university chaplain and then as the rector of parishes in Rome until becoming a bishop in 2018.

Life
Daniele Libanori was born on 27 May 1953 in Ostellato in the Ferrara province.

He received a licentiate in theology of the evangelization and a doctorate in theology of the Christian life. Libanori was ordained a priest of the Archdiocese of Ferrara on 11 June 1977 by Filippo Franceschi, Archbishop of Ferrara. After his ordination Libanori was the assistant priest for the Vigarano Mainarda parish and then the parish priest for Madonna dei Boschi from 1979 to 1983. central diocesan sector. He served as the rector of the Ferrara-Comacchio archdiocesan seminary from 1982 until 1991.

Libanori entered the Society of Jesus on 26 December 1991 and made his solemn vows as a Jesuit on 18 October 2002. He served as a university chaplain in L'Aquila from 1993 to 1997 and then spent a year in the Jesuit community in Naples for further formation experience. Libanori served as a university chaplain again for the La Sapienza University in Rome from 1998 until 2003. He was the rector of the Church of the Gesù from 2003 to 2016 and rector of the Church of San Giuseppe Falegname from 2017 until becoming a bishop in 2018.

On 23 November 2017, Pope Francis appointed Libanori an Auxiliary Bishop of Rome and titular bishop of Buruni. He received his episcopal consecration in the Lateran Basilica on 13 January 2018 from the Vicar of Rome Angelo De Donatis, with Bishops Gianrico Ruzza and Andrea Turazzi as co-consecrators. He was assigned responsibility for the central sector of the Diocese and named the diocesan delegate for the clergy and the seminaries on 24 May 2019. Libanori is also a well-known exorcist for Rome. He was named a member of the Congregation for the Causes of Saints on 14 April 2018.

The COVID-19 pandemic in 2020 saw Libanori take a vocal stand against the closing of all churches in Rome. Cardinal De Donatis issued a decree closing all Roman churches leading some like Cardinal Konrad Krajewski to ignore the directive. Pope Francis himself disapproved and requested that the decree be rescinded. Libanori himself agreed that churches needed to remain open and so sided with the pope on the issue. He issued a letter on 19 March to the priests in the central sector of the diocese where he expressed his opinions. The letter was published in La Civilità Cattolica entitled "Faith at the time of Covid-19". Libanori noted that "many complain that the closing of the churches is part of the restrictions" but affirmed that "it is the state, not the church, that must legislate in terms of public health". The bishop further elaborated that "an open church might also be a sign of comfort" for the people during the pandemic.

References

External links
 Catholic Hierarchy 

1953 births
21st-century Italian titular bishops
Bishops appointed by Pope Francis
Bishops in Lazio
Living people
Jesuit bishops
Italian Jesuits
Members of the Congregation for the Causes of Saints
People from the Province of Ferrara